The following is a summary of Dublin county football team's 2009 season.

O'Byrne Cup
2009 O'Byrne Cup

References

Season Dublin
Dublin county football team seasons